In topology, a coherent topology is a topology that is uniquely determined by a family of subspaces. Loosely speaking, a topological space is coherent with a family of subspaces if it is a topological union of those subspaces. It is also sometimes called the weak topology generated by the family of subspaces, a notion that is quite different from the notion of a weak topology generated by a set of maps.

Definition 

Let  be a topological space and let  be a family of subsets of  each having the subspace topology.

By definition, this is the finest topology on (the underlying set of)  for which the inclusion maps are continuous.
 is coherent with  if either of the following two equivalent conditions holds:

Given a topological space  and any family of subspaces  there is a unique topology on (the underlying set of)  that is coherent with  This topology will, in general, be finer than the given topology on

Examples 

 A topological space  is coherent with every open cover of   More generally,  is coherent with any family of subsets whose interiors cover   As examples of this, a weakly locally compact space is coherent with the family of its compact subspaces.  And a locally connected space is coherent with the family of its connected subsets.
 A topological space  is coherent with every locally finite closed cover of 
 A discrete space is coherent with every family of subspaces (including the empty family).
 A topological space  is coherent with a partition of  if and only  is homeomorphic to the disjoint union of the elements of the partition.
 Finitely generated spaces are those determined by the family of all finite subspaces.
 Compactly generated spaces are those determined by the family of all compact subspaces.
 A CW complex  is coherent with its family of -skeletons

Topological union 

Let  be a family of (not necessarily disjoint) topological spaces such that the induced topologies agree on each intersection  

endowed with the final topology coinduced by the inclusion maps . The inclusion maps will then be topological embeddings and  will be coherent with the subspaces 

Conversely, if  is a topological space and is coherent with a family of subspaces  that cover  then  is homeomorphic to the topological union of the family 

One can form the topological union of an arbitrary family of topological spaces as above, but if the topologies do not agree on the intersections then the inclusions will not necessarily be embeddings.

One can also describe the topological union by means of the disjoint union. Specifically, if  is a topological union of the family  then  is homeomorphic to the quotient of the disjoint union of the family  by the equivalence relation

for all ; that is,

If the spaces  are all disjoint then the topological union is just the disjoint union.

Assume now that the set A is directed, in a way compatible with  inclusion:  whenever 
. Here   is the direct (inductive) limit (colimit) 

Properties 

are continuous for each  This universal property characterizes coherent topologies in the sense that a space  is coherent with  if and only if this property holds for all spaces  and all functions 

Let  be determined by a cover  Then
 Let  be a quotient map. Then  is determined by 

 If  is continuous and each  is a quotient map, then  is a quotient map.
  is a closed map (resp. open map) if and only if each  is closed (resp. open).

As an example of this last construction, if  is the collection of all compact subspaces of a topological space  the resulting topology  defines the k-ification  of   The spaces  and  have the same compact sets, with the same induced subspace topologies.  And the k-ification  is compactly generated.

See also

Notes

References 

 
 

General topology